Alessandro Croce (1650–1704) was a Roman Catholic prelate who served as Bishop of Cremona (1697–1704).

Biography
Alessandro Croce was born in Milan, Italy on 3 July 1650 and ordained a priest on 19 September 1676.
On 2 December 1697, he was appointed during the papacy of Pope Innocent XII as Bishop of Cremona.
On 8 December 1697, he was consecrated bishop by Baldassare Cenci (seniore), Archbishop of Fermo, with Prospero Bottini, Titular Archbishop of Myra, and Sperello Sperelli, Bishop of Terni, serving as co-consecrators.
He served as Bishop of Cremona until his death on 23 September 1704.

References

External links and additional sources
 (for Chronology of Bishops) 
 (for Chronology of Bishops) 

17th-century Italian Roman Catholic bishops
18th-century Italian Roman Catholic bishops
Bishops appointed by Pope Innocent XII
1650 births
1704 deaths